Hopscotch is a visual programming language developed by Hopscotch Technologies, designed to allow young or beginner programmers to develop simple projects. It's simple UI allows its users to drag and drop blocks to create scripts that can be played when activated. The use of the language is through an iPad or iPhone supporting Hopscotch.

Software development
The idea sprang from an existing programming tool, Scratch, where the user drags blocks to create a script. The developers of Hopscotch wanted to take a step back from Scratch, making it slightly easier to grasp and use the concepts. Hopscotch's notion of events, and rules combining conditions with actions, is similar to AgentSheets.

Hopscotch includes basic programming blocks and functionalities such as variables, sprites (called objects) and text objects, but also features considered more advanced such as self-variables, maths functions and more.

Editor 

The Hopscotch app uses a UI very similar to that of Scratch. Most code blocks can have numeric, text, or math inputs. e.g. the "move" block. The editor work area is mainly based on a grid divided into X and Y-coordinates.

Editor history 
The Hopscotch Editor is available on iPhone and iPad. The iPhone version only supported viewing projects until early 2016, when an update supporting editing and account functionality was released. The Hopscotch iPhone projects play in an iPhone format even on the iPad and web player. A version for Android is not planned for release (as of 2021)

When blocks/inputs 
When inputs are the trigger for the script to activate, when a "when" block's input is true (the "when project starts" when the block is triggered when one opens the player or taps the refresh button)

Event blocks:When Game StartsWhen (Character) is tapped

When (Character) is pressedWhen (Character) bumps (Character)

When (Character) is touching (Character)When iPad is tilted (up, left, right or down)

When iPad hears a loud noise

When iPad is shakenWhen (Character) is swiped (up, left, right or down)

When I hear a message (Text)Comparison blocks:(Value) = (Value)

(Value) ≠ (Value)

(Value) < (Value)

(Value) > (Value)

(Condition) and (Condition)

(Condition) or (Condition)

Code blocks 
Code blocks are the actions completed when the blocks are triggered, code blocks fall into 6 categories: abilities, movement, drawing, looks & sounds, values, and control flow. These can be dragged into and out of the scripts to modify them. Movement blocks make the character move physically on the screen. Ability blocks let one make subprogram blocks to duplicate code in a Hopscotch project. Drawing blocks make an object draw stuff. There are 2 “draw” blocks, Draw a Trail and Clear. Draw a trail that draws a trail of selected colour and width. There are HSB and RGB options for colour. Width is determined by the number of pixels in that trail . Looks & sound blocks change the object's looks (such as size, invisibility, and colour). Value blocks set a value to a specific number or change a value by a specific number. Finally, control flow blocks can either repeat a code multiple or infinite times or add a condition which will make the code inside it execute only if the condition is matched. There is 1 exception, the “Create a Clone” block creates a clone of the object. The clone will not execute any of the code programmed for the original object. That's the job of the “When an object is cloned” block.

Drawing blocks 
Drawing blocks in Hopscotch work similar to the turtle module in Python, allowing art to be coded.

Player

In-app player 
The Hopscotch player activates the blocks in the scripts upon activation of their individual triggers.

Webplayer 
The player is also available on the web (known as the "Webplayer"). The web player brings Hopscotch projects to almost any browser. It is designed to work the same as the in-app player, but the web player does not have any functionality for coding, uploading, or liking projects. The web version of a project is only accessible via its unique link that is formatted like this: https://c.gethopscotch.com/p/project ID

Both the in-app and the web player are written in JavaScript.

Hopscotch Forum 
Hopscotch Forum is an online forum for discussion of Hopscotch projects, programming help, and Hopscotch app bug reports.

Languages 
Supported languages: English, Simplified Chinese, Spanish.

References

External links 
 

Visual programming languages
Educational programming languages